Joanne "Jo" Carter (born 17 April 1980) is an Australian former competitive figure skater. She is the 1998 Piruetten champion, the 1996 Golden Spin of Zagreb silver medalist, the 2004 Karl Schäfer Memorial bronze medalist, and a seven-time Australian national champion. She reached the free skate at the 1998 Winter Olympics and fifteen ISU Championships – four World, eight Four Continents, and three World Junior Championships.

Personal life
Carter was born on 17 April 1980 in Sydney, Australia. After completing a physiotherapy degree at Sydney University, she studied medicine.

Skating career 
On the ice from the age of four years, Carter trained in Canterbury, Norwest and Macquarie. In the 1994–1995 season, she won her first senior national title and was selected to compete at the 1995 World Junior Championships. She qualified for the free skate and finished 19th overall at the event, which was held in November 1994 in Budapest, Hungary. She would soon win her first international medals – at the 1995 Summer Trophy (bronze) and 1996 Golden Spin of Zagreb (silver).

In the 1996–1997 season, Carter won her third senior national title and finished 16th at the 1997 World Junior Championships, held in November 1996 in Seoul, South Korea. In March 1997, she competed at her first senior ISU Championship – the 1997 World Championships in Lausanne, Switzerland. Achieving her career-best Worlds result, she finished 11th overall after ranking 10th in qualifying group A, 10th in the short program, and 12th in the free skate.

In the 1997–1998 season, Carter appeared at her first Champions Series (later known as Grand Prix series) competition – the 1997 NHK Trophy, where she finished 11th. After winning her fourth consecutive national title, she represented Australia at the 1998 Winter Olympics in Nagano, Japan; she ranked 11th in the short program, 12th in the free skate, and 12th overall. The following season, she was awarded gold at Piruetten in Hamar, Norway, as well as her fifth national title.

Carter missed the 1999–2000 season due to a knee injury. She took bronze at the Australian Championships in the 2001–2002 season and silver during the next four seasons. Her career-best result at an ISU Championship, fourth, came at the 2005 Four Continents in Gangneung, South Korea. In February 2006, she competed in Turin at her second Winter Olympics; ranked 25th in the short program, she missed qualifying for the free skate by one spot.

Carter's last major event was the 2007 World Championships in Tokyo, Japan. She qualified for the free skate and finished 20th overall.

In 2007, Carter retired from competition and became a principal performer for Holiday on Ice, with which she would skate for five years. She also coached figure skating in the Sydney area.

Programs

Results
GP: Champions Series / Grand Prix

1996–97 to 2007–08

1992–93 to 1995–96

References

External links

 

1980 births
Australian female single skaters
Olympic figure skaters of Australia
Figure skaters at the 1998 Winter Olympics
Figure skaters at the 2006 Winter Olympics
Living people
Sportswomen from New South Wales
Figure skaters from Sydney
Competitors at the 2001 Goodwill Games
Competitors at the 2003 Winter Universiade